McHenry is both a surname and a given name, an anglicised name of the Scottish Clan Henderson. Notable people with the name include:

Surname:
 Austin McHenry (1895–1922), Major League Baseball player
 Donald McHenry (born 1936), American former diplomat
 Doug McHenry (born 1952), American film director and producer
 Edwin Harrison McHenry (1859–1931), American engineer; chief engineer of the Northern Pacific and Canadian Pacific Railways
 Henry McHenry (born 1944), American professor of anthropology
 Henry McHenry (baseball) (1910–1981), Negro league baseball pitcher and outfielder
 James McHenry (1753–1816), a delegate to the U.S. Constitutional Convention and a signer of the Constitution
 John Geiser McHenry (1868–1912), United States Representative from Pennsylvania
 John H. McHenry (1797–1871), United States Representative from Kentucky
Leah McHenry (born 1984), Canadian musician
 Mary McHenry (born 1933), American scholar
 Patrick T. McHenry (born 1975), U.S. Representative from North Carolina
 Robert McHenry (born 1945) American writer and editor
 Ross McHenry, Australian musician, band leader of the Shaolin Afronauts
 The McHenry Brothers, Edward Alexander (born 1983) and Rory Patrick McHenry (born 1987), British film directors and screenwriters
 Travis McHenry (born 1980), leader of the unrecognized micronation of Grand Duchy of Westarctica
 William McHenry (1771?–1835), American soldier and politician

Given name:
 James McHenry Jones (1859–1909), American educator, school administrator, businessperson, and minister
 McHenry Boatwright (1928–1994), American opera singer and teacher